Picture This is the debut studio album by American hip hop group Do Or Die. It was released on September 3, 1996, via Rap-A-Lot Records. Recording sessions took place at Creator's Way Studios in Chicago and at Lil J Studio in Houston. Production was handled by The Legendary Traxster, Mike Dean and Crazy C, with J. Prince serving as executive producer. It features guest appearances from Twista and Johnny P.

The album proved to be a huge success, peaking at number 27 on the Billboard 200 and number 3 on the Top R&B/Hip-Hop Albums. The album featured the hit single, "Po Pimp", which peaked at number 22 on the Billboard Hot 100 and topped the Hot Rap Singles.

Track listing

Personnel
Anthony "N.A.R.D." Round – vocals
Darnell "Belo Zero" Smith – vocals
Dennis "AK47" Round – vocals
Carl "Twista" Mitchell – vocals (tracks: 3, 5, 11)
John "Johnny P" Pigram – vocals (tracks: 3, 6)
Samuel "The Legendary Traxster" Lindley – producer (tracks: 1-3, 6-10), engineering, mixing
Mike Dean – producer (tracks: 4, 5), engineering, mixing, mastering
Simon "Crazy C" Cullins – producer (track 11)
James A. Smith – executive producer
Tony "Big Chief" Randle – production supervisor
Denise Milford – photography

Charts

Weekly charts

Year-end charts

Certifications

References

External links

1996 debut albums
Do or Die (group) albums
Rap-A-Lot Records albums
Albums produced by The Legendary Traxster
Albums produced by Mike Dean (record producer)